HFC may stand for:

Chemicals
 Hafnium carbide
 Hydrofluorocarbons

Financial institutions
HFC Bank, part of HSBC Finance
Home Finance Company, known in Ghana as "HFC Bank"

Places
Hall for Cornwall, a theatre in Cornwall, UK
Heng Fa Chuen, a town located on the Eastern part of Hong Kong Island, Hong Kong
 Heng Fa Chuen station; MTR station code HFC

Sports
Hyderabad FC, an Indian professional football club
Hallescher FC, a German Football club
Haughmond F.C., an English semi-professional football club
Hawthorn Football Club, an Australian rules football club
Heart of Midlothian F.C. ("Hearts"), a Scottish association football club
Heidelberg Football Club, an Australian rules football club
Hendon F.C., an English football club
Hereford F.C., an English football club
Hibernian F.C., a Scottish association football club
Histon F.C., an English association football club
Horsham F.C., an English football club
Hull FC, a British rugby league football club
Hyde FC, English football club
Koninklijke HFC, a Dutch football club

Other
Home Front Command, a military term used in a military-civilian population context
High Field Consultants, a company specializing in high electric fields
High frequency content measure, used to characterize the amount of high-frequency content of a signal
Hundred Flowers Campaign, a brief interlude in the People's Republic of China from 1956 to 1957 
Hybrid fiber-coaxial, a type of broadband network
House Freedom Caucus, a conservative Republican caucus in the U.S. House of Representatives founded in 2015
Hydrogen fuel cell, a type of vehicle power plant